The  is the legislative assembly of Aichi Prefecture.

Its 103 members are elected in 57 districts by single non-transferable vote (SNTV) to four-year terms.

The assembly is responsible for enacting and amending prefectural ordinances, voting on important administrative appointments made by the governor including the vice-governors and approving the budget – Aichi has been in recent years the only prefecture besides Tokyo with a "fiscal strength index" (zaiseiryoku shisū) above 1, i.e. it is able to cover its calculated expenses with its own revenues.

Current composition 
The last elections were held in the unified local elections in April 2011: the Liberal Democratic Party remained strongest party with 49 seats but fell short of a majority without independents, former Democrat and Nagoya City mayor Takashi Kawamura's Genzei Nippon ("Tax cuts Japan") and former Liberal Democrat and Aichi governor Hideaki Ōmura's Nippon-ichi Aichi no Kai ("Aichi First in Japan Association") together won 18 seats. The Democratic Party was reduced to 26 seats – down from 38 in 2007 – in one of its few (relative) strongholds in local politics. Kōmeitō won six seats, four seats went to independents. The Japanese Communist Party has not been represented in the assembly since 2003.

As of March 2014, the assembly is composed as follows:

Electoral districts 
As in all prefectures, most electoral districts correspond to wards of "major cities designated by government ordinance" (Nagoya City), ordinary cities and former counties. 28 districts are single-member districts where the single non-transferable vote becomes equivalent to first-past-the-post voting and a plurality of votes suffices to win 100% of seats. 20 districts are two-member districts where usually – depending on nomination strategy and local strength of third parties – an even seat split between the major two parties is likely (in the absence of third parties and assuming realistic nomination strategies, winning both seats would require at least a two-thirds majority of votes). Nine districts elect three or more assembly members.

References

External links
 Aichi Prefectural Assembly 
 Aichi electoral commission

Political parties
 LDP Aichi Prefectural Assembly group, official blog 
 DPJ Aichi Prefectural Assembly group, official website 
 Genzei Nippon, official website 
 Aichi Nippon-ichi no Kai, official website 
 Kōmeitō Aichi Prefectural Assembly group, official website 
 Prefectural federations or regional websites of national parties currently not represented in the Aichi assembly
 Japanese Communist Party, Aichi Committee 
 Your Party, Tōkai Region local assembly members 
 Social Democratic Party, Aichi Prefectural Federation 

Politics of Aichi Prefecture
Prefectural assemblies of Japan
1879 establishments in Japan